Curling at the 2019 European Youth Olympic Winter Festival was held from 11 to 15 February at Sports hall Peki in Istočno Sarajevo,  Bosnia and Herzegovina.

A total of 14 mixed teams competed for one set of medals.

Medal summary

Medal table

Medalists

Teams

Group A

Group B

Round-robin standings

Round-robin results
All times are local (UTC+1).

Group A

Draw 1
Monday, 11 February, 8:30

Draw 3
Monday, 11 February, 15:30

Draw 5
Tuesday, 12 February, 9:30

Draw 7
Tuesday, 12 February, 17:30

Draw 9
Wednesday, 13 February, 12:00

Draw 11
Wednesday, 13 February, 19:00

Draw 13
Thursday, 14 February, 13:30

Group B

Draw 2
Monday, 11 February, 12:00

Draw 4
Monday, 11 February, 19:00

Draw 6
Tuesday, 12 February, 13:30

Draw 8
Wednesday, 13 February, 8:30

Draw 10
Wednesday, 13 February, 15:30

Draw 12
Thursday, 14 February, 9:30

Draw 14
Thursday, 14 February, 17:00

Playoffs

Bracket

Semifinals
Friday, 15 February, 9:00

Bronze medal game
Friday, 15 February, 13:30

Gold medal game
Friday, 15 February, 13:30

Final standings
The final standings are:

References

European Youth Olympic Winter Festival
2019 European Youth Olympic Winter Festival events
2019